Nuccio Ordine (born 18 July 1958 in Diamante) is an Italian author and philosopher, professor of literature at the University of Calabria. He is one of the world's top experts on Renaissance and the philosopher Giordano Bruno.

Activities 
Ordine is a fellow of the Harvard University Center for Studies of the Italian Renaissance and of the Alexander von Humboldt Stiftung. He has taught at the American universities of Yale and New York, and at the European universities EHESS, Ecole Normale Supérieure Paris, Paris-IV Sorbonne, Paris-III Sorbonne-Nouvelle, CESR of Tours, Institut Universitaire de France, Paris-VIII Vincennes, Institut des Études Avancées de Paris, Warburg Institute and Eichstätt University.

His books have been translated in many languages, including Chinese, Japanese and Russian.

In France he is a general editor of two series at Les Belles Lettres Publishing House: the complete works of Giordano Bruno and the “Bibliotheque Italienne”.

In Italy, he is the general editor of the “Sileni” series at Liguori Publishing House, the “Classics of European thinking” series at Nino Aragno Publishing House, and the “Classics of European literature” series at Bompiani Publishing House. Nuccio Ordine also writes for the "Corriere della Sera" newspaper.

Honours 

Knight of the French Legion of Honour, Ecole Normale Superieure, Paris, December 2012 

 Commander of the Ordine al Merito della Republica Italiana, 2010

 Chevalier dans l’Ordre des Palmes académiques, 2009

Honorary Member of the Institute of Philosophy of the Russian Academy of Sciences, 2010

Laurea Honoris Causa of the Federal University of Rio Grande de Sul, 2011

Doctor Honoris Causa of the Catholic University of Louvain, 2020

Books

Non Fiction 
The Threshold of Shadow (Orig. "La soglia dell'ombra") (2003), Published by Marsilio; (2004) Revised 2nd Edition; (2009) 3rd Edition; translations: French (Les Belles Lettres, 2003), Spanish (Siruela, 2008), Portuguese (Perspectiva, 2006), Romanian (Institutul Cultural Roman, 2005), Russian(Saint Petersburg University Press, 2008), Deutsch (Königshaus & Neumann 2009)
Giordano Bruno and the Philosophy of the Ass (Orig.La cabala dell'asino) (1987), Published by Liguori, Italy; (2005) Revised 2nd Edition; translations: French (Les Belles Lettres, 1993, 2005); English (Yale University Press, 1996); German (Wilhelm Fink, 1999); Chinese (Oriental Press, 2005); Romanian (Humanitas, 2004); Japanese (Toshindo, 2002); Portuguese (Educs, 2008)
Giordano Bruno, Ronsard and Religion (2007), Published by Cortina, Italy; (2009) Revised 2nd Edition; translations: French (Albin Michel, 2004)
Theory of Short Stories and Theory of Laughter in the 16th Century (Orig.Teoria della novella e teoria del riso nel '500 (1996), Published by Liguori, Italy; (2009) Revised 2nd Edition; translations: French (Vrin/Nino Aragno, 2002)
The Meeting of Knowledges (Orig. Le rendez-vous des savoirs) (1999), Published by Kliencksieck, France; (2009) Les Belles Lettres, Paris.
Three crowns for a king. The device of Henry III and its mysteries (Orig. Trois couronnes pour un roi. La devise d'Henri III et ses mystères (Paris, Les Belles Lettres, 2011)

Awards 
 Rombiolo; 2007
 Filosofia Siracusa; 2007
 Anassilaos; 2006 for the  Megale Hellas section
 Orient Express; 2003
 Cesare de Lollis; 2003
 Le Città della Magna Grecia; 1987

See also 
 Giordano Bruno 
 Renaissance
 Eulama

References 

Pierre Hadot (Collège de France in Paris): "Nuccio Ordine is well known to the public for his excellent studies on Giordano Bruno. He is one of the major contemporary experts on the whole social, artistic, literary, and spiritual milieu of the Renaissance and the Early Modern period. In the present work, he offers us a remarkable model of method in the field of philosophical exegesis, for he succeeds in reconstructing, in a very precise manner, the intellectual and spiritual itinerary of Giordano Bruno during the period, 1582-1585".

Paul Oskar Kristeller: "The rich and complicated work will introduce the attentive reader to a vast number of primary and secondary sources on Western thought from  antiquity   to  early  modern  times  that  would  otherwise  have escaped him".

George Steiner: "The reader will find in Nuccio Ordine a marvellously faithful and revealing guide to the ardent, magical world of Giordano Bruno".

Umberto Galimberti in «La Repubblica»: "A magisterial and engrossing introduction to Bruno".

External links 
Official Eulama Representation Page
 Review of "Contro il vangelo armato. Giordano Bruno, Ronsard e la religione", Cortina, Milan 2007
Video: "Lectio magistralis held at the Scuola Superiore Studi Umanistici directed by Umberto Eco"
Interview about Giordano Bruno in Diogene
Video Interview about Giordano Bruno on Rai International
Review and comment about Giordano Bruno's works
Interview in "Lettera Internazionale"
Remo Bodei's review in The New York Review of books
Presentation of "Contro il Vangelo armato" (Roma, Camera dei Deputati)
Roundtable with Umberto Eco and Giulio Giorello, on “Contro il Vangelo armato” (Reggio Emilia, 25 november 2007)
"La conquista della conoscenza”(RAI 1)

1958 births
Living people
20th-century Italian philosophers
21st-century Italian philosophers
20th-century Italian novelists
20th-century Italian male writers
Academic staff of the University of Paris
New York University faculty
Yale University faculty
Harvard University people
Italian literary critics
Italian male novelists
Italian male non-fiction writers